"Ridin' Rims" is the third single off Dem Franchize Boyz second album On Top of Our Game.

Charts
The song reached #80 on the Billboard Hot 100, #40 on the Hot R&B/Hip-Hop Songs chart and #22 on the Rap Songs chart.

References

Crunk songs

2006 singles
2006 songs
Dem Franchize Boyz songs
Song recordings produced by Jermaine Dupri
So So Def Recordings singles